The Chrysler B and RB engines are a series of big-block V8 gasoline engines introduced in 1958 to replace the Chrysler FirePower (first generation Hemi) engines. The B and RB engines are often referred to as "wedge" engines because they use wedge-shaped combustion chambers; this differentiates them from Chrysler's 426 Hemi big block engines that are typically referred to as "Hemi" or "426 Hemi" due to their hemispherical shaped combustion chambers.

Design

The 361 would continue in production until the end of the series, albeit only for truck installation. Unlike the previous B-engines, which had a  stroke, the RB engines had a  stroke.

The last 'B-RB' wedge-headed engine was produced in August 1978, ending the era of Chrysler "big-block" engines.

B engines
All Low Block B-series engines have a  stroke, a  deck height and  connecting rods, resulting in a 1.88:1 rod ratio.

350
The  B engine was, along with the 361, the first production B engine, first available in 1958. The 350 is classified as a big block engine. All parts except for the pistons are fully compatible with the 361.

Vehicles using the B 350:

 1958 DeSoto Firesweep
 1958 Dodge Coronet
 1958 Plymouth Fury

361
In 1962, the Dodge Polara 500 came standard with a  version of the 361 that had a four-barrel carburetor, dual-point distributor, and dual exhausts. Plymouth called their versions of the early B engine the Commando, variants of which included the Golden Commando and Sonoramic Commando. It produced . DeSoto's B engine was named Turboflash and produced . The Dodge standard version was a 2-barrel with  called the Super Red Ram with an optional variant that was called the D500 and produced .

The 361 would last until the end of the series, albeit for trucks only. In its early years, the 305-horsepower 361 was optional on many vehicles, and standard on, among others, the Dodge 880. The 361 had a fuel injected version in 1958 only. Very few of the fuel injected B engines were made and only a handful remain, since most were brought back to the dealer to be fitted with carburetors.

 1961–1964 Chrysler Newport
 1959-1961 Chrysler Windsor (Canada only, sedans and coupes)
 1958–1961 DeSoto
 1958–1966 Dodge
 1966 Dodge Charger
 1959–1965 Plymouth
 Facel Vega HK500
 1958–1961 Facel Vega Excellence (EX1)
 Jensen CV8
 1963-1973 Cadillac Gage V-100 Commando APC (M75 Chrysler industrial engine, waterproof)
 1973-1988 Cadillac Gage V-150 Commando APC (M75 Chrysler industrial engine, optional)
 1966-1974 Food Machinery Corp. M-113 APC, (M75 Chrysler industrial engine, waterproof)

383

The 383 cu in B engine — not to be confused with the RB version — was essentially a larger bore version of the 350 and 361, using a  bore for a  displacement. This venerable engine was introduced in 1959. Dodge's version, the D500 had a cross-ram induction manifold and dual four-barrel carburetors as options. In some Dodge applications, this engine was labeled as the Magnum, while the Plymouth version was called the Golden Commando. Both came with a dual point distributor in high-performance versions.

The 383 became the standard model Mopar performance engine for the next decade. The big bore allowed for larger, intake valves, and the relatively short stroke helped it to be a free-revving and free-breathing engine.

The 1960 383 engines featured the same basic ram induction system as the Chrysler 300F's 413 RB engines (named Sonoramic Commando when sold in Plymouth form). The later 383 Magnum (starting in 1968) used the 440 Magnum heads, camshaft, and exhaust manifolds.

 1962–1965 Chrysler 300 base models
 1961–1971 Chrysler Newport
 1959–1971 Chrysler Town and Country
 1962–1971 Plymouth Sport Fury
 1966 Chrysler R/T police special in Canada
 1959–1960 DeSoto
 1965–1971 Dodge Monaco
 1965–1971 Dodge Coronet
 1967-1971 Dodge Charger
 1970-1971 Dodge Challenger
 1963–1965 Dodge Custom 880
 1967–1969 Dodge Dart
 1960–1971 Dodge Polara
 1968-1971 Dodge Super Bee
 1967–1971 Plymouth Barracuda
 1960–1971 Plymouth Savoy
 1960-1971 Plymouth Belvedere
 1960–1971 Plymouth Fury
 1968–1971 Plymouth Road Runner
 1965–1971 Plymouth Satellite
 Bristol 411
 Facel Vega HK500
 1961–1964 Facel Vega Excellence (EX2)
 Facel Vega Facel II
 Jensen CV8
 Jensen Interceptor MKI and II
 Jensen FF

400
The  B engine was introduced in 1972 to replace the venerable 383, and were power-rated via the net (installed) method. Chrysler increased the bore size of the 383 to create the 400. All parts except for the pistons were interchangeable between the 383 and 400.

Crankshafts were of cast iron composition. All three versions used the same 8.2:1 compression ratio. The 400 was used in car, truck, and motorhome chassis. Horsepower and torque ratings gradually declined through the years due to the addition of more federally mandated emissions controls, until all Chrysler passenger vehicle big-block production ceased in 1978. For its last year of production, it only produced  (although a heavy-duty version was also available).

Due to its large factory bore size, short (compared to RB engines) deck height, and bottom end strength that is greater than any other production B or RB engine due to extra material added around the main bearing caps, 400 B engine blocks have become a popular choice for high-performance engine build ups.

RB engines
The RB engines, produced from 1959 to 1979, are raised-block (taller) versions of the B engines. All RB engines have a  stroke, with the bore being the defining factor in engine size. All RBs are oversquare.

383

It was only available in 1959 and 1960 on the US-built Chrysler Windsors and Saratogas; one of Trenton Engine's lines had been converted to the new RB engine (to make the 413), and demand for the 383 B engine was too high for the remaining line. The solution was to create a 383 RB to fill the gap until the plant figured out how to quickly switch from one block to the other.

413
The  RB was used from 1959 to 1965 in cars. It was also used in medium and heavy trucks including truck-tractors such as the C-1000, up until 1979. It has a bore of 4.1875 inches. During that period, it powered almost all Chrysler New Yorker and all Imperial models, and was also available on the lesser Chryslers, Dodge Polara, Dodge Monaco, and Plymouth Fury as an alternative to the B-block 383 and the A-block 318. It was also fitted to some European cars such as the later Facel Vega Facel II.

In 1960, a long-tube ram induction system was made standard on the Chrysler 300. It continued as standard on the 1961 300-G, and remained on the option sheets for Chrysler 300s through 1964. In 1962, a special version known as the "Max Wedge" was made available for drag racing and street use; this version produced  at 5,000 rpm.

426 Wedge

Not to be confused with the 426 Hemi, the  RB was a wedge-head RB block with a  bore. The 426 Wedge served as Chrysler's main performance engine until the introduction of the 426 Hemi. It was initially offered as the "non-catalogued" option S42 in Chryslers (the number of such produced is uncertain), offered with  via a single 4-barrel carburetor (11.0:1 or 12.0:1 compression ratio, respectively), or  via ram-inducted dual 4-barrel carburetors (with the same compression ratios). For 1963, horsepower ratings would slightly increase (see below), and it became optional in B-bodied Dodges and Plymouths. After 1963, it would be used only in Dodges and Plymouths.

The Max Wedge was a race-only version of the 426 Wedge engine offered from the factory. Known as the Super Stock Plymouth and Ramcharger Dodge, the Max Wedge featured high-flow cylinder heads developed through state-of-the-art (at the time) airflow testing. They had 1⅞-inch exhaust valves, which required the cylinder bores to be notched for clearance. The blocks were a special severe-duty casting with larger oil-feed passages than other RB engines, and the blocks were stress-relieved by the factory. Induction came by means of a cross-ram intake manifold tuned for peak power above 4000 rpm and two Carter AFB-3447SA 4-barrel carburetors. The Max Wedge also included high-flow cast-iron exhaust manifolds that, on the later versions, resembled steel tube headers.

Before the end of the 1963 model year, Chrysler introduced the Stage II Max Wedge with improved combustion chamber design and an improved camshaft. The last performance year for the Max Wedge came in 1964 with the Stage III. The factory-advertised power rating never changed despite the Stage II and III improvements.

A 426 Street Wedge block was also available in 1964 and 1965. It bears little relation to the Max Wedge except for basic architecture and dimensions. The Street Wedge was available only in B-body cars (Plymouth and Dodge) and light-duty Dodge D Series trucks. It was an increased-bore version of the standard New Yorker 413 single 4-barrel engine.

440

The  RB was produced from 1965 until 1978, making it the last version of the Chrysler RB block.

In 1972, changes were made to the horsepower ratings of vehicle engines from gross (engine only, without air cleaner, exhaust system, alternator, or other power-consuming components) to net (with alternator, air cleaner, mufflers, and other vehicle equipment installed). The new rating system produced lower, more realistic numbers for any given engine. At the same time, emissions regulations were demanding cleaner exhaust. Engines including the 440 were made with reduced compression, modified cam timing, and other tuning measures to comply with the newly tightened emissions regulations. The 1972 440 produced  (gross) at 4400 rpm; the new net rating was —which very closely coincided with period German DIN ratings and TÜV measurements.

The high-output 440 (4-barrel/mild cam/dual exhausts) was marketed as the Magnum in Dodges, the Super Commando in Plymouths, and the TNT in Chryslers. It was also available in marine and heavy-duty commercial applications until that year.

 Chrysler 300 letter series
 Chrysler 300 non-letter series
 Chrysler New Yorker
 Chrysler Newport
 Chrysler Town and Country
 Dodge B-series vans
 Dodge Coronet
 Dodge Charger
 1970–1971 Dodge Challenger
 1969 Dodge Dart
 Dodge Charger Daytona
 Dodge M-Series Chassis
 Dodge Monaco
 Dodge Polara
 Dodge Ramcharger
 1974-1978 Plymouth Trail Duster
 1969–1971 Dodge Super Bee
 Imperial
 1969–1971 Plymouth Barracuda
 Plymouth Belvedere
 Plymouth Fury
 Plymouth GTX
 Plymouth Road Runner
 Plymouth Superbird
 Plymouth VIP
 Jensen Interceptor
 Monteverdi Safari
 1968-197? Cadillac Gage V-200 Commando (waterproof, export Singapore Armed Forces)

Crate engines
Chrysler also offers complete new 'crate' engines through its Mopar parts division in various displacements, these engines are built from entirely new parts.

See also
 Chrysler ball-stud hemi
 Chrysler engines

References

External links

 The RB Engines: 383, 413, 426, and 440   -Allpar.com

B
V8 engines
Gasoline engines by model